Lesnoy Prospect or prospekt (from adject. lesnoy "of forest") is a major longitudinal street ( prospekt) of the right-hand Vyborg Side of the river Neva delta in Saint Petersburg, Russia, connecting the city's downtown with the central part of its northern Vyborgskiy District - the namesake  of the Saint Petersburg Forestry University (formerly Forst-Institut, Lesnoy Institute), founded in early 19 century and becoming a local landmark. With the growth of the city and its suburbs, the avenue takes over it and adjacent streets automobile traffic to further northeastern districts. The whole of the avenue's left-hand side belongs to Vyborgskiy District and its Sampsoniyevskoye Municipal Okrug, while the southern part of the avenue's right-hand side is in Kalininskiy District of Saint Petersburg.

From its southern  beginning at Saint Petersburg Military Medical Academy to its northern end at the park of Saint-Petersburg State Forestry University the avenue features a number of historic buildings and public gardens.

History

Objects

References

Links

 The avenue's buildings on Citywalls.ru
 The avenue on Encyclopedia of Saint Petersburg (in Russian)

Streets in Saint Petersburg

Vyborgskiy_District_of_Saint_Petersburg